Fachen (Irish and Scottish) – Monster with half a body
 Fafnir (Germanic mythology) – Dwarf who was cursed and turned into a dragon. He was later slain by Sigurd in the Saga of Nibelung.
 Fairy (many cultures worldwide, esp. Germanic mythology/folklore) – Nature spirits
 Familiar (English) – Animal servant
 Far darrig (Irish) – Little people that constantly play pranks
 Farfadet (French) – Small (some half-meter tall), wrinkled, and brown-skinned helpful sprites.
 The Fates (Greek) – Three time-controlling sisters
 Faun (Roman) – Human-goat hybrid nature spirit
 Fear gorta (Irish) – Hunger ghost
 Feathered Serpent – Mesoamerican dragon
 Fei Lian (Chinese) – Chinese wind god
 Fenghuang (Chinese) – Chinese Phoenix, female in marriage symbol
 Fenodyree (Manx) – House spirit
 Fenrir (Norse) – Gigantic, ravenous wolf
 Fetch (Irish) – Double or doppelgänger
 Fext (Slavic) – Undead
 Finfolk (Orkney) – Fish-human hybrid that kidnaps humans for servants
 Fir Bolg (Irish) – Ancestral race
 Fire Bird (Many cultures worldwide) – Regenerative solar bird
 Firedrake (Germanic) – Dragon
 Fish-man (Cantabrian) – Amphibious, scaled humanoid
 Flatwoods Monster (American Folklore) (West Virginia) – Alien, humanoid 
 Fomorian (Irish) – Goat-headed giant
 Forest Bull (Medieval Bestiaries) – Giant horned red cattle
 Freybug – Norfolk black dog
 Fuath (Celtic) – Malevolent water spirit
 Fucanglong (Chinese) – Underworld dragon
 Funayūrei (Japanese) – Ghosts of people who drowned at sea
 Furu-utsubo (Japanese) – Animated jar
 Futakuchi-onna (Japanese) – Woman with a second mouth on the back of her head
 Fylgja (Scandinavian) – Animal familiar

F